Jazz Canada Montreux 1978 is an album by Tommy Banks Big Band with guest Big Miller, which was released in 1978 by Radio Canada International. It won the 1979 Juno Award for Best Jazz Album.

References 

1978 live albums
Juno Award for Best Jazz Album albums
Jazz albums by Canadian artists